The bandon was the basic military unit and administrative territorial entity of the middle Byzantine Empire. It derived from the Gothic , which is proof of foreign influence in the army at the time this type of unit evolved.

Origin
The term was used already in the 6th century, mentioned by Procopius, as a term for a battle standard, and soon came to be applied to the unit bearing such a standard itself. From the reign of Nikephoros I (802–811) it was the name for a subdistrict of the Byzantine .

Organization

Each of six  had fifty men, organized in five  of ten men each. All four officers were lancers.

Late empire
At the beginning of the 10th century the infantry unit consisted of 256 men (16x16), and cavalry unit of 300 men (6x50), but the manuals indicate that the unit strength in fact varied between 200 and 400 men. The work Praecepta Militaria by Nikephoros II Phokas (963–969) indicates that the cavalry  was only 50 strong. Unlike other middle Byzantine administrative and military terms, the  survived well into the late Byzantine period, and remained the basic territorial unit of the Empire of Trebizond until its fall.

References

Sources

Further reading

Types of administrative division
Military units and formations of the Byzantine Empire